The Lulonga is a river in the Equateur province of Democratic Republic of the Congo. It is about 200 km long from its beginning at the town of Basankusu. The Lopori and the Maringa join to form the Lulonga there. The Lulonga River flows into the Congo River at the village of Lulonga.

References

Province of Équateur
Tributaries of the Congo River
Rivers of the Democratic Republic of the Congo